Phylloxiphia metria is a moth of the family Sphingidae. It is known from Brachystegia woodland Mozambique to Zambia and the Democratic Republic of the Congo and north to Malawi and Tanzania.

The length of the forewings is about 37 mm for males and 45 mm for females. The head and thorax are light brown, but much darker than the abdomen. The forewings are pale pinkish brown, mottled and marked with darker brown. The hindwings are pinkish red. Females have broader and more rounded wings.

References

Phylloxiphia
Moths described in 1920
Lepidoptera of the Democratic Republic of the Congo
Moths of Sub-Saharan Africa
Lepidoptera of Mozambique
Lepidoptera of Malawi
Lepidoptera of Tanzania
Lepidoptera of Zambia
Lepidoptera of Zimbabwe
Miombo